Qazim Sejdini (born February 12, 1951) is an Albanian politician serving as mayor of Elbasan, Albania since 2007. Sejdini was nominated by the SPA to run for mayor and won in the February 18 election. He was sworn into office in May 2007.

References

Living people
Mayors of Elbasan
Place of birth missing (living people)
1951 births